Celebration for a Champion is an outdoor bronze sculpture commemorating Jesse Owens' achievements by Curtis Patterson, installed on the Ohio State University campus in Columbus, Ohio, United States.

Description and history
The abstract polished bronze artwork, dedicated on May 4, 1984, commemorates Jesse Owens' track and field career at Ohio State and the Olympics. It has four triangle-shaped pieces representing the world records he set at the Big Ten Conference in 1935 and his gold medals at the 1936 Summer Olympics.

It is located in Jesse Owens Plaza immediately north of Ohio Stadium.   Prior to remodeling, Ohio Stadium contained the track where Jesse ran while at Ohio State.

The sculpture cost $100,000. It was surveyed by the Smithsonian Institution's "Save Outdoor Sculpture!" program in 1994.

See also

 1984 in art

References

External links
 Celebration for a Champion at Columbus Makes Art, Greater Columbus Arts Council

1984 establishments in Ohio
1984 sculptures
Abstract sculptures in the United States
Bronze sculptures in Ohio
Cultural depictions of Jesse Owens
Monuments and memorials in Ohio
Outdoor sculptures in Columbus, Ohio